The Grey Hounded Hare is a 1949 Looney Tunes short film made by Warner Bros. Pictures and starring the voice talent of Mel Blanc. The film stars Bugs Bunny. It was directed by Robert McKimson, and animated by John Carey, Phil DeLara, Manny Gould and Charles McKimson, with music scored by Carl Stalling.  The title refers to the greyhounds of the plot as well as "hounded" meaning pestered or pursued relentlessly.

Plot
After a race at a greyhound track comes to a conclusion, Bugs Bunny pops out of a hole, wondering what all the 'racket' is. He quickly finds out where he is when the announcer says that the patrons have time to make their selections for the next dog race. Bugs, after picking up a programme, decides to check out the competing dogs in the kennels, commenting positively on dog #7, a large grey greyhound named Gnawbone, whom Bugs inadvertently angers.

Upon hearing the starting bugle, Bugs goes outside to watch the race from trackside. Before the race begins, the announcer announces some of the dogs that are racing, including "Bill's Bunion", "Pneumatic Tire", "Father's Moustache", "Motorman's Glove", "Bride's Biscuit" and "Grandpa's Folly" (the latter of which has been "scratched" from the race, as in uncontrollable itching), in an homage to Spike Jones' "William Tell Overture."

Bugs watches as a rabbit lure is led out. Not realizing the rabbit is a mechanical fake, Bugs instantly falls in love with it ("Wow! What a hunk of feminine pulchritoodee!"). Upon seeing the dogs being released from their starting boxes, declaring that "chivalry is not dead", Bugs decides to "rescue" the lure and jumps into the track, taking down some of the dogs one at a time. During this sequence, the announcer, shocked at what he sees, kills himself off-screen. Bugs eventually teases the dogs enough that they start chasing him out of the track and into a taxi, which speeds off towards the Dog Pound. However, Gnawbone was not fooled and is waiting for Bugs.

Bugs then faces off with Gnawbone through trickery, first using a balloon decoy, then using a dynamite stick. Finally, Gnawbone has had it and starts to charge at Bugs "like a bull" in attempt to kill the rabbit once and for all, but Bugs plays matador and causes Gnawbone to charge into a fire hydrant, putting the dog out of commission, with a white flag of surrender on his tail.

After defeating Gnawbone, now free to pursue "Dreamboat" unhindered, Bugs gives the lure a kiss, getting a large electric shock, just before the lure goes back into its starting box. He goes for another kiss and gets electrocuted again.

Home media
This cartoon is available, uncensored and uncut, on Disc 1 of the Looney Tunes Golden Collection: Volume 4 DVD set.

References

External links

 
 

1949 films
1949 short films
1949 animated films
1940s Warner Bros. animated short films
Films directed by Robert McKimson
Looney Tunes shorts
Animated films about dogs
Films scored by Carl Stalling
Bugs Bunny films
1940s English-language films